Princes Dock was a railway station on the Liverpool Overhead Railway, adjacent to the dock of the same name.

It was opened on 6 March 1893 by the Marquis of Salisbury.

The station closed, on 13 March 1941, due to extensive damage during the World War II Blitz. No evidence of this station remains.

References

Disused railway stations in Liverpool
Former Liverpool Overhead Railway stations
Railway stations in Great Britain opened in 1893
Railway stations in Great Britain closed in 1941